Federico Hernán Pereyra (born January 4, 1989 in Río Cuarto, Argentina) is an Argentine footballer who currently plays for Coquimbo Unido.

Career
During his professional career he has played for clubs in five countries including ASIL Lysi in Chipre, Cerro Reyes in Spain, Central Córdoba, Juventud Unida Universitario and Tristán Suárez in his native country, as well as Bolivian sides Blooming and The Strongest and Chilean sides Huachipato and Coquimbo Unido.

Club career statistics

Personal life
He is the younger brother of the Argentine former footballer Guillermo Pereyra.

Honours
Coquimbo Unido
  Primera B (1): 2021

References

External links
 
 Federico Pereyra profile Soccerpunter

1989 births
Living people
People from Río Cuarto, Córdoba
Argentine footballers
Argentine expatriate footballers
ASIL Lysi players
AD Cerro de Reyes players
Central Córdoba de Santiago del Estero footballers
Juventud Unida Universitario players
CSyD Tristán Suárez footballers
Club Blooming players
The Strongest players
FC Zirka Kropyvnytskyi players
FC Karpaty Lviv players
C.D. Huachipato footballers
Coquimbo Unido footballers
Cypriot Second Division players
Segunda División B players
Torneo Federal A players
Primera B Metropolitana players
Ukrainian Premier League players
Bolivian Primera División players
Chilean Primera División players
Primera B de Chile players
Expatriate footballers in Chile
Argentine expatriate sportspeople in Spain
Expatriate footballers in Spain
Argentine expatriate sportspeople in Cyprus
Expatriate footballers in Cyprus
Argentine expatriate sportspeople in Bolivia
Expatriate footballers in Ukraine
Argentine expatriate sportspeople in Ukraine
Association football defenders
Argentine expatriate sportspeople in Chile
Expatriate footballers in Bolivia
Sportspeople from Córdoba Province, Argentina